Georges-C. Lachance (11 January 1926 at Montreal, Quebec  - 10 October 2020) was a Liberal party member of the House of Commons of Canada. He was a lawyer by career.

He was first elected at the Lafontaine riding in
the 1962 general election, then re-elected there in the 1963, 1965, 1968 and 1972 elections. After completing his term in May 1974 for the 29th Canadian Parliament, Lachance left federal office and did not campaign in future federal elections.

Claude-André Lachance, his son, served as a Member of Parliament from 1974 to 1984.

References

External links
 
 Georges Lachance fonds, Library and Archives Canada.

1926 births
2020 deaths
Lawyers from Montreal
Liberal Party of Canada MPs
Members of the House of Commons of Canada from Quebec
Politicians from Montreal
French Quebecers